Arvid Strömberg (born 30 June 1991 in Stockholm, Sweden) is a professional Swedish ice hockey player. He is currently a forward for Djurgårdens IF in Elitserien.

Career statistics

References

External links

1991 births
Djurgårdens IF Hockey players
Swedish ice hockey forwards
Living people
Ice hockey people from Stockholm